Antonio Croce (born 9 June 1986) is an Italian footballer who plays as a forward for ASD Team Altamura.

Career

Vis Pesaro
Born in Foggia, Apulia, Croce started his career at Marche club Vis Pesaro and was a member of its Berretti under-20 team. In the next season Croce made his debut in the first team, in 2004–05 Serie C1. He was spotted by F.C. Internazionale Milano in January 2005. He was the member of Primavera under-20 team, scoring 4 goals in 2005 Torneo di Viareggio, as topscorer (Premio "Miglior Cannoniere del Torneo"). Eventually Inter was the fourth. However, he only scored once in the Primavera League. In the playoffs round, Croce was the starting forward along with Matteo Momentè. He scored once in the round of 16. In that rebuild season of Inter Primavera, the regular season top-scorer was Matteo Lombardo with 5 goals. and Dino Marino was the playoffs top-scorer of the team with 2 goals only. Inter was eliminated by Empoli in quarter-finals. Inter did not purchase Croce and promoted players from its own youth system instead.

Modena and fell to Serie D
On 31 August 2005, Croce was signed by Serie B club Modena but immediately farmed to Marche club Fermana in a co-ownership deal. In June 2006 Croce was re-signed by Emilia club Modena but he was released to Serie D team Riccione. The team also located in Emilia–Romagna region. Croce once again failed to score, with 3 goals. Croce then went to Abruzzo region for Cologna Paese. This time Croce scored 11 goals in 2007–08 Serie D.

Return to Lega Pro 2nd Div.
Croce earned a professional contract from Padova, in 2008. He played in the pre-season friendlies. In August, he left for Carpenedolo, a Lega Pro Seconda Divisione team. Finally Croce opened his account in the Italian fourth level, with 7 goals. In the next season he was signed by another fourth level team Cassino, and left the club 6 months before the club was expelled from the league due to financial difficulty. However his new club Pro Vasto faced the same fate. In July 2010, his contract with Padova was terminated by mutual consent, as there is no place for Croce in its 2010–11 Serie B campaign.

In 2010–11 Lega Pro Seconda Divisione, Croce was signed by Villacidrese. However Croce faced another relegation. In 2011–12 Lega Pro Seconda Divisione, Croce was signed by Celano. However the team again relegated.

In July 2012 Croce was signed by Serie D team Messina which the club aimed to promote back to professional league in recent seasons and recently acquired by a new owner. In January 2013 he returned to the fourth level again for Melfi. He became the eldest player of the team suppressing Giancarlo Improta. Both Croce and Improta were the goalscorers of the team.

Return to Serie D
In 2013–14 and 2014–15 season, Croce had played for four Serie D teams, which since 2014–15 season Serie D became the four level again, due to Lega Pro merged their two divisions.

Monopoli
In December 2014 he was signed by another Serie D club Monopoli. On 15 July 2015 Croce renewed his contract with the club. The club won promotion to 2015–16 Lega Pro as a replacement of bankrupted teams on 1 September.

Teramo
In June 2016 Croce was signed by Teramo.

Andria
On 30 January 2017, Croce was transferred to fellow Serie C club Andria.

Later career
In July 2018 Croce was signed by Serie D club Gravina.

References

External links
 Football.it Profile 
 

1986 births
Sportspeople from Foggia
Footballers from Apulia
Living people
Italian footballers
Association football forwards
Vis Pesaro dal 1898 players
Inter Milan players
Fermana F.C. players
Calcio Padova players
A.C. Carpenedolo players
A.S.D. Cassino Calcio 1924 players
Vastese Calcio 1902 players
S.S. Villacidrese Calcio players
Celano F.C. Marsica players
A.C.R. Messina players
A.S. Melfi players
S.S.D. Città di Brindisi players
S.S. Teramo Calcio players
S.S. Fidelis Andria 1928 players
Taranto F.C. 1927 players
Serie C players
Serie D players